763d Expeditionary Reconnaissance Squadron is a reconnaissance squadron of the United States Air Force currently assigned to 379th Expeditionary Operations Group, a United States Air Forces Central Command unit.

See also

 List of United States Air Force reconnaissance squadrons

References

Reconnaissance squadrons of the United States Air Force